Stacy Dorning (born 11 May 1958) is an English actress, best known for appearing in the second series of The Adventures of Black Beauty (1973–74). She also appeared in Just William (1977–78) and Keep It in the Family (1980–83). 

Dorning was born in London; she is the elder daughter of actors Robert Dorning and Honor Shepherd, and older sister of actress Kate Dorning.

TV credits

Film credits

References

External links

1958 births
Living people
English film actresses
English television actresses
20th-century English actresses